Michael Wade (October 30, 1944 – May 22, 2004) was a Canadian actor, writer and musician. Born in Avondale, Newfoundland, he founded Newfoundland's first Shakespeare company in 1984.

A graduate of Memorial University of Newfoundland, he first published poetry in Harold Horwood's anthology Voices Underground. In the early 1970s he formed the rock band Ash Wednesday with Drew McGillivray. He briefly moved to Los Angeles in the late 1970s, but by 1981 was back in St. John's, where his first play, The Fig Tree, debuted with a cast that included Mary Walsh. His later plays included The Past Itch, The First Stone and Last Dance at the Avalon.

As an actor, his film and television credits included John and the Missus (1986), The Adventure of Faustus Bidgood (1986), Finding Mary March (1988), The Boys of St. Vincent (1992), Secret Nation (1992), Gullage's (1996) and Misery Harbour (1999), and he had a recurring role in the CBC Radio comedy series The Great Eastern as Ish Lundrigan. His stage credits included productions of Shakespeare's The Tempest, Peter Luke's Hadrian the Seventh, Edward Riche's List of Lights, Anton Chekhov's Uncle Vanya and Ray Guy's Swinton Massacre.

Wade was nominated for a Gemini Award, and received a best actor Moonsnail Award at the 1996 Atlantic Film Festival, for his work in Gullage's.

Returning to older pursuits in his later years, he published a volume of poetry, Poems, in 1999, and released a solo album, One Way Love, in 2003.

He died of cancer at his home in St. John's on May 22, 2004.

References

External links

1944 births
2004 deaths
20th-century Canadian male actors
21st-century Canadian male actors
20th-century Canadian dramatists and playwrights
21st-century Canadian dramatists and playwrights
20th-century Canadian poets
21st-century Canadian poets
Canadian male film actors
Canadian male television actors
Canadian male stage actors
Canadian male poets
Canadian male dramatists and playwrights
Canadian rock singers
Canadian theatre directors
Male actors from Newfoundland and Labrador
Writers from Newfoundland and Labrador
Musicians from Newfoundland and Labrador
Memorial University of Newfoundland alumni
20th-century Canadian male writers
21st-century Canadian male writers
20th-century Canadian male singers
21st-century Canadian male singers